Sylvius S. Moore Sr. (February 24, 1912 – September 10, 2004) was an American football player and coach. He served as the head football coach at his alma mater, Hampton University in Hampton, Virginia, from 1943 to 1944, compiling a record of 5–7–1.

Head coaching record

College

References

1912 births
2004 deaths
Hampton Pirates football coaches
Hampton Pirates football players
High school football coaches in Virginia
People from Cape May, New Jersey
Players of American football from New Jersey
African-American coaches of American football
African-American players of American football
20th-century African-American sportspeople
21st-century African-American people